Viscount Torrington is a title in the Peerage of Great Britain. It was created in 1721 for the statesman Sir George Byng, 1st Baronet, along with the subsidiary title Baron Byng, of Southill in the County of Bedford, also in the Peerage of Great Britain. He had already been created a baronet, of Wrotham in the County of Kent, in the Baronetage of Great Britain in 1715. His eldest son, the second Viscount, represented Plymouth and Bedfordshire in the House of Commons and later served as Captain of the Yeomen of the Guard from 1746 to 1747. His younger brother, the third Viscount, was a major-general in the Army. His grandson, the sixth Viscount, was a vice-admiral in the Royal Navy. His son, the seventh Viscount, served as Governor of Ceylon between 1847 and 1850.

On his death the titles passed to his nephew, the eighth Viscount, the son of Honourable Robert Barlow Palmer Byng, third son of the sixth Viscount. He was succeeded by his son, the ninth Viscount. However, this line of the family failed on his death in 1944 and the titles passed to the late Viscount's first cousin, the tenth Viscount. As of 2013 the titles are held by the latter's grandson, the eleventh Viscount, who succeeded on his grandfather's death in 1961.

Several other members of the Byng family have also gained distinction. The Hon. Robert Byng, third son of the first Viscount, was Member of Parliament for Plymouth. He was the father of George Byng, radical Member of Parliament for Middlesex. He was the father of George Byng, Father of the House of Commons, and John Byng, 1st Earl of Strafford. The soldier Julian Hedworth George Byng, 1st Viscount Byng of Vimy, was the youngest son of the second Earl of Strafford.

Admiral the Hon. John Byng, who was controversially court-martialled and shot in 1757, was the fourth son of the first Viscount Torrington. He was the only British admiral ever executed after a court-martial.

The family seat is Great Hunts Place, near Winchester, Hampshire. The traditional burial place of the Viscounts Torrington is the Byng Vault at the Church of All Saints, Southill, Bedfordshire.

Another notable member of the family was Captain Launcelot Alfred Cranmer-Byng (23 Nov. 1872 - 15 Jan. 1945) whose translations of Tang Dynasty poets provided the texts for most of 25 Songs from the Chinese Poets by Granville Bantock.

Viscounts Torrington (1721)
George Byng, 1st Viscount Torrington (1663–1733)
Pattee Byng, 2nd Viscount Torrington (1699–1747)
George Byng, 3rd Viscount Torrington (1701–1750)
George Byng, 4th Viscount Torrington (1740–1812)
John Byng, 5th Viscount Torrington (1743–1813)
George Byng, 6th Viscount Torrington (1768–1831)
George Byng, 7th Viscount Torrington (1812–1884)
George Stanley Byng, 8th Viscount Torrington (1841–1889)
George Master Byng, 9th Viscount Torrington (1886–1944)
Arthur Stanley Byng, 10th Viscount Torrington (1876–1961)
Timothy Howard St George Byng, 11th Viscount Torrington (born 1943)

The heir presumptive is the present holder's fifth cousin Colin Hugh Cranmer-Byng (born 1960).
The heir presumptive's heir apparent is his son eldest John Nicholas Cranmer-Byng (born 1990).

See also
Earl of Strafford (1847 creation)
Viscount Byng of Vimy

References

External links

Viscountcies in the Peerage of Great Britain
Noble titles created in 1721
Byng family